Tony Pizarro is an American entertainment executive and record producer, listed as one of the "Top 50 Hip Hop Producers" of all time. 
Contributing to selling over 75 million records as Tupac Shakur's producer, songwriter, recording engineer, and mixing engineer, Pizarro is one of hip hop's most notable producers, playing an instrumental part in Tupac achieving one of the best-selling music artists in the world. Memorable for co-writing and producing the hit single "Dear Mama", which was inducted into the Library of Congress, which made Tupac Shakur the third American rapper to have a song honored in the National Recording Registry.

Several years after Tupac's death, Pizarro re-emerged as one of Def Jam Recordings top performing executive A&R/producers. Pizarro promoted prominent artists such as DMX, Scarface, MOP, WC, and Keith Murray. Facilitating DMX in the films Coach Carter and Cradle 2 The Grave.

Pizarro, a multi talented musician, catapulted to the top of urban music in the early 1990s, by mixing a (radio mix) for the hit single "I Wanna Sex You Up" by R&B group Color Me Badd. Enjoying success, Pizarro continued working as a recording and mixing engineer for artists such as Ice-T, Teena Marie, and Tevin Campbell.

References

External links

Year of birth missing (living people)
Living people
American record producers